Elections to Brisbane City Council were held on Saturday 28 March 2020 to elect a councillor to each of the local government area's 26 wards and the direct election of the Lord Mayor of Brisbane.

The election resulted in the re-election of the Liberal National Party under Adrian Schrinner as Lord Mayor and the Liberal National Party with a majority council.

In the Lord Mayoral election, Adrian Schrinner and the Liberal National Party was declared the winner after defeating Pat Condren and the Labor Party on a two-party-preferred basis - 56.3% to 43.7%.

In the ward elections, there were no changes to the representation of the 26 wards. With the Liberal National Party holding onto the 19 wards they already held, the Labor Party retaining the 5 wards they already held along with the Greens and Independents retaining their single wards each.

Pendulum

Results

Mayoral election

Ward elections

References

2020 elections in Australia
2020
March 2020 events in Australia
2020s in Brisbane